Chain World is a video game designed by Jason Rohrer, and built on the game Minecraft. Chain World won the 2011 Game Design Challenge. The goal of the challenge was to create a game that could become a religion. The official name of the challenge was GDC: The Game Design Challenge: Bigger Than Jesus.

Only one known copy of the game exists on a customized USB flash drive. The game was designed to be played by only one player at a time who would alter the game world. Future players were to be chosen by the current USB drive holder. After his GDC presentation, Rohrer passed the game on, apparently at random, to audience member Jia Ji. Jia Ji created controversy by selling the game on eBay for charity, and imposing his own set of rules about who could play Chain World after the auction winner.

The current location of the flash drive is unknown, though in June 2012, Positional Super Ko, believed to be the winner of Jia Ji's auction, tweeted that they still have the drive.  In February 2016, Positional Super Ko tweeted again that they no longer have the drive.

The game was originally created using Minecraft Beta 1.8 version, using Chain World as the seed. The USB stick itself was given a custom treatment by Rohrer to create the appearance of an ancient artifact.

References

External links 
Video of Jason Rohrer's Presentation
eBay Chain World Auction
"official" Chain World website by Jia Ji (defunct)
Mirror of original site (defunct)
 A new kind of minecraft chain world on reddit

Indie video games